Danny McNamara may refer to:
Danny McNamara (musician)
Danny McNamara (footballer)
Danny McNamara, a character from the TV series Blood & Treasure

See also
 Daniel McNamara, Australian politician
 Dan McNamara, American artist and humorist